Darshana Singh (born 10 July 1974) is an Indian politician and a member of the Rajya Sabha, the upper house of the Parliament of India from Uttar Pradesh as a member of the Bharatiya Janata Party. She is also holding the position of National Vice President of BJP Mahila Morcha. She previously served as State President of BJP UP Mahila Morcha.

Early life 
She is gold medalist in her MA in History from DAV College, Azamgarh in 1996. Later, she completed P.G. Diploma in Journalism and Visual Communication from Allahabad University.

Positions held 
 05-July-2022 To Present, Member of the Parliament Rajya Sabha.
 21-June-2021 To Present, National Vice President of BJP Mahila Morcha.
 10-Feb-2018 To 21-June-2021, UP President of BJP Mahila Morcha.
 2016–2018, Secretary of Bhartiya Janta Party, Kashi area, Uttar Pradesh
 2013–2015, Bhartiya Janta Party District President, Mahila Morcha of Chandauli district, Uttar Pradesh
 2011–2013, Bhartiya Janta Party District President, Mahila Morcha of Chandauli district, Uttar Pradesh

References

External links
Personal Website

Bharatiya Janata Party politicians from Uttar Pradesh
Living people
Rajya Sabha members from Uttar Pradesh
Women members of the Rajya Sabha
1974 births